= Boeing 8C =

Gas turbine

- Type: Turbojet
- National origin: United States
- Manufacturer: Boeing
- Major applications: Ford Thunderbird

The Boeing 8C was a gas turbine that was tested in a Ford Thunderbird. The turbine was capable at 175hp and required exhaust pipes to be installed at the front out the side. It was developed around August 1955 to March 1956 after the Ford Thunderbird was released to the public. However, the project remained a secret until 2022.

== See also ==
- List of aircraft engines
